Smelowskia, sometimes called false candytufts, is a genus of flowering plants in the crucifer family Brassicaceae, native to mountains and arctic regions of Asia and western North America. They may or may not be of Beringian origin.

Species
Currently accepted species include:

Smelowskia alba (Pall.) Regel
Smelowskia altaica (Pobed.) Botsch.
Smelowskia americana Rydb.
Smelowskia annua Rupr.
Smelowskia bartholomewii (Al-Shehbaz) Al-Shehbaz & Warwick
Smelowskia bifurcata (Turcz. ex Ledeb.) Botsch.
Smelowskia borealis (Greene) W.H.Drury & Rollins
Smelowskia calycina (Stephan ex Willd.) C.A.Mey.
Smelowskia czukotica (Botsch. & V.V.Petrovsky) Al-Shehbaz & Warwick
Smelowskia flavissima Kar. & Kir.
Smelowskia furcata (Al-Shehbaz) Al-Shehbaz & Warwick
Smelowskia heishuiensis (W.T.Wang) Al-Shehbaz & Warwick
Smelowskia inopinata (Kom.) Kom.
Smelowskia jacutica (Botsch. & Karav.) Al-Shehbaz & Warwick
Smelowskia johnsonii G.A.Mulligan
Smelowskia media (W.H.Drury & Rollins) E.M.Velichkin
Smelowskia micrantha (Botsch. & Vved.) Al-Shehbaz & Warwick
Smelowskia mongolica Kom.
Smelowskia ovalis M.E.Jones
Smelowskia parryoides (Cham.) Polunin
Smelowskia pectinata (Bunge) E.M.Velichkin
Smelowskia porsildii (W.H.Drury & Rollins) Jurtzev
Smelowskia pyriformis W.H.Drury & Rollins
Smelowskia sisymbrioides (Regel & Herder) Paulsen
Smelowskia sophiifolia (Cham. & Schltdl.) Al-Shehbaz & Warwick

References 

Brassicaceae
Brassicaceae genera